Peter Purvis Webb (15 February 1854 – 28 November 1920) was a New Zealand rugby union player. A forward, he was a member of the first national side in 1884.

Biography
Born in Wellington in 1854, Webb was educated at Wellington College. He played for the Wellington Football Club from 1875 and was captain in 1887. He represented Wellington at a provincial level from 1879 to 1885, and was a member of the first New Zealand national side, which toured New South Wales, in 1884, playing in eight matches (none of which were internationals). He appeared in the team's first match and briefly was the oldest living All Black, until Edwin Davy made his debut.

Outside of rugby, Webb was a public servant for 50 years, joining the Treasury Department in 1869. Five years later he transferred to the Audit Department, rising to become Deputy Controller and Auditor-General. He retired on his 65th birthday in 1919 and died in Wellington the following year. He was buried at Karori Cemetery.

References

1854 births
1920 deaths
Rugby union players from Wellington City
People educated at Wellington College (New Zealand)
New Zealand international rugby union players
New Zealand rugby union players
Wellington rugby union players
Rugby union forwards
New Zealand public servants
Burials at Karori Cemetery